Junction Gate is a village in the province of Manicaland, Zimbabwe located 6 km west from the Mozambique border and about 20 km east of Chipinge.

Populated places in Manicaland Province